Anciently, Magnesia was a region of Ancient Greece, eventually absorbed by ancient Thessaly. Originally inhabited by the Magnetes (Μάγνητες), Magnesia was the long and narrow slip of country between Mounts Ossa and Pelion on the west and the sea on the east, and extending from the mouth of the Peneius on the north to the Pagasaean Gulf on the south. The Magnetes were members of the Amphictyonic League, and were settled in this district in the Homeric times, and mentioned in the Iliad. The Thessalian Magnetes are said to have founded the Asiatic cities of Magnesia ad Sipylum and Magnesia on the Maeander. The towns of Magnesia were: Aesonis, Aphetae, Boebe, Casthanaea, Cercinium, Coracae, Demetrias, Eurymenae, Glaphyrae, Homole or Homolium, Iolcus, Magnesia, Meliboea, Methone, Mylae, Nelia, Olizon, Pagasae, Rhizus, Spalaethra, and Thaumacia.

References

 
Geography of ancient Thessaly
Historical regions in Greece